The girls' 50 metre backstroke event at the 2010 Youth Olympic Games took place on August 18–19, at the Singapore Sports School.

Medalists

Heats

Heat 1

Heat 2

Heat 3

Semifinals

Semifinal 1

Semifinal 2

Final

Lovisa Eriksson (SWE) dropped out and was replaced by Isabella Arcila (COL).

References
 Heat Results
 Semifinals Results
 Final Result

Swimming at the 2010 Summer Youth Olympics